Oğuzhan Efe Yılmaz (born 17 June 2003) is a Turkish professional footballer who plays as a defensive midfielder for the Turkish club Kasımpaşa.

Professional career
Yılmaz began his senior career with Ankaraspor in 2019. On 19 July 2022, he transferred to the Süper Lig club Kasımpaşa. He made his professional debut with Kasımpaşa on 28 August 2022 in a 1–0 Süper Lig win over Hatayspor, coming on as a substitute in the 82nd minute.

International career
Yılmaz was called up to a training camp for the Turkey U19s in December 2021.

References

https://www.gundemtube.com/guncel-haberler/kasimpasa-ankaraspordan-oguzhan-efe-yilmazi-transfer-etti/

External links
 
 

2003 births
Living people
People from Yenimahalle
Turkish footballers
Ankaraspor footballers
Kasımpaşa S.K. footballers
Süper Lig players
TFF First League players
TFF Second League players
Association football midfielders